Boiga cyanea, commonly known as the Green cat snake, is a colubrid snake species found in South Asia, China and South-east Asia.

Description

Medium to large in length, slightly compressed, medium bodied snake with a moderately long tail. Head distinct from narrow neck with a rounded snout. Eyes large in size with vertically elliptical pupils. Dorsal scales smooth with single or double apical pits. Ventrals with a feeble lateral keels. Dorsal scale count usually 21 - 21 ( 23 ) - 15. Its long prehensile tail makes it purely arboreal.	
                                    
Dorsal color uniform green or green mixed with grayish or bluish. Belly color greenish or yellowish white. Top of the head usually similar to dorsal color or sometimes of brownish tint. Upper lip color yellowish; most of head scaled margined with black. Eyes golden brown. Hatchlings are reddish brown with a green head. The color of the hatchlings starts to change after 8–9 months of age.

Length: Maximum: 190 cm. Common: 115 cm. (SVL. 87 cm.)

Distribution
The green cat snake found in Bangladesh, Bhutan, Cambodia, China (Yunnan- part), India (Sikkim, Darjeeling & Jalpaiguri, West Bengal, Assam, Arunachal Pradesh, Andaman & Nicobar Islands), Laos, Malaysia (West), Myanmar, Nepal, Thailand (incl. Phuket) and Vietnam.

Ecology 
Habitat: Terrestrial & arboreal; inhabits primary and secondary forests, including montane zones, and can also be found at sea level in coastal forests.  
                                                   
Habit: Nocturnal. Occasionally seen on the ground searching for prey. Very mild disposition, sluggish, and makes no attempt to escape when approached or when handled. Difficult to provoke into striking. By day stays coiled up amongst tree branches, but by night actively hunts for prey. 
                                                                                      
Diet: Carnivorous; feeds mainly on lizards. Also takes frogs, birds, rodents and also other snakes. This rear fanged & mildly venomous snake can paralyze small prey. If threatened, it will become hostile and posture with a wide open mouth.  
                                                   
Reproduction: Oviparous; Eggs are laid approximately 42–50 days after mating and lays 7-14 eggs from late Winters to late Summers; incubation period approximately 85 days.

Threats
Occasionally found in the pet trade.

Medical significance
Bites by this species not expected to cause medically significant effects and the only risk, probably small, local secondary infection. Patients presenting with bites by these snakes do not require medical attention, other than to check for infection and ensure tetanus immune status. Patients should be advised to return if local symptoms develop, suggesting secondary infection. Bites unlikely to cause more than mild to moderate local swelling & pain, occasionally local bruising, paresthesia/numbness, erythema or bleeding, but no necrosis and no systemic effects. While most cases will be minor, not requiring admission, some cases will be more severe, requiring admission and treatment, so assess carefully before early discharge.

References

 Boulenger, George A. 1890 The Fauna of British India, Including Ceylon and Burma. Reptilia and Batrachia. Taylor & Francis, London, xviii, 541 pp.
 Duméril, A. M. C., Bibron, G. & Duméril, A. H. A., 1854 Erpétologie générale ou histoire naturelle complète des reptiles. Tome septième. Deuxième partie, comprenant l'histoire des serpents venimeux. Paris, Librairie Encyclopédique de Roret: i-xii + 781-1536
 Frith, C.B. 1977 A survey of the snakes of Phuket island and adjacent mainland areas of peninsular Thailand. Nat. Hist. Bull. Siam Soc. (Bangkok) 26: 263-316

External links
 Boiga cyanea in Thailand

cyanea
Snakes of Southeast Asia
Reptiles of Thailand
Taxa named by André Marie Constant Duméril
Taxa named by Gabriel Bibron
Taxa named by Auguste Duméril
Reptiles described in 1854